Magnet fishing, also called magnetic fishing, is searching in outdoor waters for ferromagnetic objects available to pull with a strong neodymium magnet.

The hobby is a combination of environmentalism and treasure hunting. The magnets used are strong enough to remove large debris such as discarded bicycles, guns, safes, bombs, grenades, coins and car tire rims from bodies of water, but many who engage in the hobby are hoping to find rare and valuable items as well. 

It is thought magnet fishing was initially started by boaters using magnets to recover fallen keys from the water.

Tools 

Potential harms
Some environmentalists worry that removing objects can stir up sediment that contains toxic materials, or disturb archaeological sites. Some magnet fishers have retrieved dangerous objects, including loaded guns, unexploded ordnance, and sharp pieces of metal.

Neodymium magnets are powerful and can interfere with pacemakers, posing a health risk; they can also damage other electronic devices. Fingers can get crushed between the magnet and a piece of metal, potentially causing serious bodily harm. Tetanus can also be a risk for those without an up-to-date tetanus vaccine.

Two men are known to have drowned while magnet fishing, but the cause is uncertain, and post-mortem toxicology tests showed both had recently used cannabis.

Magnet fishing and the law

Depending on the jurisdiction, anything of value may belong to the local government, not the finder.

England and Wales 
Magnet fishing is subject to local regulations concerning outdoor waters. The Canal & River Trust, which owns most of the 
canals in England and Wales, has bylaws prohibiting people from removing material from the canal and rivers it owns, so fishers may be subject to a £25 fine for magnet-fishing or removing any material from canal or inland navigation under the control of the Canal & River Trust in England or Wales, other than the Lee and Stort Navigation, Gloucester and Sharpness Canal, and River Severn Navigation. The Trust "expressly prohibit[s]" the practice, although it refrains from legal action against first-time offenders. In 2018, a child magnet-fished a sawn-off shotgun out of the Titford Canal in Oldbury, West Midlands.

Scotland 

Magnet fishing is allowed in Scotland, as long as the fisher has obtained a Scheduled Monument Consent from Historic Environment Scotland, and permission from Scottish Canals. An official group exists which gives its members permission to magnet fish in a stretch of the Union Canal in Edinburgh, with more locations planned in the future. Archaeological or historical finds must be reported to Treasure Trove Scotland.

Germany 
In Hamburg, magnet fishing without a permit is punishable by fine.

Belgium 
Amateur magnet-fishers in Belgium helped the police by recovering new evidence, specifically firearms and ammunition, related to the crimes of the Brabant killers.

In general, police urge those who find weapons or similar items to contact them.

Poland 
According to Polish penal code, possession of magnetic materials without a valid government permit is a crime punishable by up to two years imprisonment.

United States 
In the US, there are no federal laws restricting metal fishing. Magnet fishing in state waters without a license is prohibited in South Carolina under the Underwater Antiquities Act. In Indiana, magnet fishing is allowed on public waters on DNR properties by permit. The magnet must be able to be carried and retrieved by hand.

Popularity
The hobby has been adopted by celebrities such as English rugby player James Haskell.

See also

References

External links
 
 

Magnetism
Hobbies
Water pollution
Public archaeology
Treasure
Metal detecting
Litter
Waste collection